Ukraine competed at the 2002 Winter Paralympics in Salt Lake City, United States. 10 competitors from Ukraine won 12 medals, 6 silver and 6 bronze, and finished 18th in the medal table.

See also 
 Ukraine at the Paralympics
 Ukraine at the 2002 Winter Olympics

References 

2002
2002 in Ukrainian sport
Nations at the 2002 Winter Paralympics